Wissem Hosni (born 8 March 1985) is a Tunisian long-distance runner. At the 2012 Summer Olympics, he competed in the Men's marathon, finishing in 71st place. He is a three-time participant at the IAAF World Cross Country Championships, having taken part in 2010, 2011 and 2013.

References

1985 births
Living people
Tunisian male long-distance runners
Tunisian male marathon runners
Tunisian male cross country runners
Olympic athletes of Tunisia
Athletes (track and field) at the 2012 Summer Olympics
Athletes (track and field) at the 2016 Summer Olympics
World Athletics Championships athletes for Tunisia
Mediterranean Games silver medalists for Tunisia
Athletes (track and field) at the 2013 Mediterranean Games
Mediterranean Games medalists in athletics
21st-century Tunisian people